The Tanzer 7.5 is a Canadian trailerable sailboat, that was designed by Johann Tanzer and first built in 1977. The design went out of production in 1985.

Production
The boat was built by Tanzer Industries Limited in Dorion, Quebec and 790 were constructed.

Design
The Tanzer 7.5 is a small recreational keelboat, built predominantly of fibreglass, with wood trim. It has a masthead sloop rig, a transom-hung rudder and a fixed fin keel, with an optional shoal draft keel. The standard fin keel version displaces  and carries  of ballast. A self-tacking jib on a boom was a factory option.

The boat is normally fitted with a small  outboard motor for docking and maneuvering.

The design has sleeping accommodation for four people, with a double "V"-berth in the bow cabin and two straight settee berths in the main cabin around a folding table. The galley is located on both sides just aft of the companionway ladder. The galley is equipped with an ice box and a sink to starboard, with a two-burner stove to port. The head is located just aft of the bow cabin on the port side.

The shoal draft version of the boat has a PHRF racing average handicap of 228 with a high of 237 and low of 207, while the fin keel model has a PHRF of 201.

Operational history
In a review Michael McGoldrick wrote, "Down below, the 7.5 has a nicely laid out interior which features two full length settees on both sides of the cabin (unlike the Tanzer 26s which were built after 1979, which have a truncated settee on the starboard side of the cabin). Headroom in the Tanzer 7.5 is getting tight for anyone over 5' 9", and the v-berth only was enough space to sleep one adult or two children. One of the settees in the main cabin converts into a double to provide place to sleep a fourth adult...The Tanzer 7.5 would be a good choice for a small family or a couple who aren't too tall, and are looking for an easy handling boat."

In a 2010 review Steve Henkel wrote, "designer/builder Johann Tanzer tried to put together a Boat for All Sailors. He started with a sleek hull with choice of fin keel ... for those who want more performance or shoal draft ... for those who sail in shallow-water areas. Then he took the unusual step of adding a self-tacking jib on a jib-boom, making the boat much easier to singlehand upwind, and offering some appeal to the family learning to sail, who might be bothered by 'all those strings to pull,' while also offering a conventional array of other foresails for better performance under specific conditions of wind and sea. Tanzer also tried to maximize space below by using a raised-deck configuration with a bubble-like cabin added on top, giving increased headroom as well as more storage space ... Best features: Tanzer succeeded in most of the design ideas he tried to incorporate. Worst features: the shoal draft model doesn't do well upwind compared to conventional craft; adding a centerboard would have made her better."

Variants

Tanzer 7.5
Tanzer 7.5 SD

See also

List of sailing boat types

Related development
Tanzer 22

Similar sailboats
Bayfield 25
Cal 25
Cal 2-25
Catalina 25
Catalina 250
C&C 25
Jouët 760
Kelt 7.6
Kirby 25
O'Day 25
MacGregor 25
Mirage 25
Redline 25
Sirius 26
Tanzer 25
US Yachts US 25

References

External links

Keelboats
1970s sailboat type designs
Sailing yachts
Trailer sailers
Sailboat type designs by Johann Tanzer
Sailboat types built by Tanzer Industries